Great Spruce Head Island is a privately owned island in Penobscot Bay, Maine. It is part of Deer Isle town in Hancock County, Maine. It has long belonged to the family of the painter Fairfield Porter and his brother, photographer Eliot Porter, both of whom did creative work there.  For example, Eliot's book Summer Island (1966) is a visual tribute to the island.

References

Islands of Hancock County, Maine
Islands of Maine
Coastal islands of Maine
Private islands of Maine